Vitaly Shin (born 21 June 1961) is a Kazakhstani archer. He competed in the men's individual and team events at the 1996 Summer Olympics.

References

External links
 

1961 births
Living people
Kazakhstani male archers
Olympic archers of Kazakhstan
Archers at the 1996 Summer Olympics
Place of birth missing (living people)
Archers at the 1994 Asian Games
Archers at the 2002 Asian Games
Asian Games medalists in archery
Asian Games bronze medalists for Kazakhstan
Medalists at the 1994 Asian Games
Medalists at the 2002 Asian Games
21st-century Kazakhstani people